Mother West is a record label based in New York City. It was founded in 1990 by Charles Newman and Paul Casanova as a vehicle to release the first record, Noreally Thanks, for their band Please. Since then and under the helm of Newman, Mother West has grown from a small label and recording studio to a full-service organization offering music licensing, publicity and promotions, customized distribution, online sales and state of the art recording facilities. The company now works with artists including The Magnetic Fields, Flare, AM, Gospel Music, Kris Gruen, The Davenports, and Dylan Trees.

Artists

 Aarktica
 Aloud
 Aluminum Babe
 AM
 Austin Hartley-Leonard
 Bela
 Bob Sharkey
 Bryan Fenkart
 Ceramic
 Charles Newman
 Codachrome
 Cold Blood Club
 Dead Leaves Rising
 Dylan Trees
 Earlymay
 Electric Ladybugs
 Escapade
 Flare
 Growch
 Idustrial Tepee
 James Marks
 JC Milo 
 Jon DeRosa
 Jubei
 Kelly Snyder
 Kris Gruen
 Lauren Molina
 Lost Tricks
 M-16
 Outta Luck
 Pale Horse and Rider
 Peter Fand
 Please
 Plexus
 Radio America
 Red Radio
 Sam Barron
 Scott Conners
 Shannon Corey 
 Speed Dial
 Stuart Hart
 The Bowmans
 The Davenports
 The Domestics
 Teddy Grey
 The Old Nationals
 The Sound of Monday
 The Ton-Ups
 The Walkup
 Tom Shaner
 Transmissions From The Speaker Zone
 Tremulous Monk
 Vidi Vitties
 VJS Productions

See also 
 List of record labels

References

External links
 Mother West's Official site

Record labels established in 1990
American record labels